Syver Wærsted (born 8 August 1996) is a Norwegian cyclist, who currently rides for UCI ProTeam .

Major results
2016
 1st Scandinavian Race Uppsala
2017
 3rd Fyen Rundt
 7th Ruota d'Oro
2018
 1st Ringerike GP
 3rd Overall International Tour of Rhodes
1st Stage 3
 3rd Road race, National Under–23 Road Championships
 6th Grand Prix de la ville de Pérenchies
2020
 4th Overall Course de Solidarność et des Champions Olympiques

References

External links

1996 births
Living people
Norwegian male cyclists
Sportspeople from Skien